Guldursun-Kala, also Guldursun Qala, in modern Karakalpakstan, Uzbekistan, was an ancient fortress in Chorasmia built in the 12th century CE. It is one of the largest fortresses of Khwarezm, with perimeter walls of about 1 kilometer in total length, and an internal area of about 6.4 hectares (64,000 square meters, or 15.8 acres).

It is part of the "Fifty fortresses oasis" in modern-day Uzbekistan. It was last occupied by Muhammad II of Khwarazm (1169, 1200-20), before it fell to the Mongol conquest of the Khwarazmian Empire.

References

Central Asia
Archaeology of Iran
Archaeological sites in Uzbekistan
Former populated places in Uzbekistan
Kushan Empire